Nature Studies is an illustrated manuscript of the 16th century, which represents nature scenes. It was part of the collection of the Holy Roman Emperor Rudolph II.

Description
The codex is made of parchment and measuring 48.7 x 36.1 centimeters. It is bound in green leather.

The manuscript is part of the Austrian National Library in Vienna.

Analysis
Part of the Austrian National Library since 1783, when it acquired the personal collection of Rudolf II. Images are grouped thematically and include plants, birds, mammals, insects, fish, and natural landscapes. The technique they display is extremely varied - from very simple drawings, through in-depth studies to detailed images. Many of the animals depicted on the album are in the museum; perhaps they served as models. The illustrations are drawn with pen and ink, watercolor, tempera, and in some parts used and gold. The album is composed of several different authors.

Gallery

References

External links
 Naturstudien Rudolf, II., Heiliges Römisches Reich, Kaiser, 1552-1612, Österreichische Nationalbibliothek

Austrian culture
16th-century manuscripts
Rudolf II, Holy Roman Emperor
Natural history books